Dianthiphos is a genus of sea snails, marine gastropod mollusks in the family Pisaniidae.

Species
Species within the genus Dianthiphos include:
 Dianthiphos bernardoi (Costa & Gomes, 1998)
 Dianthiphos electrum Watters, 2009

References

External links
 Watters, G. T. (2009). A revision of the western Atlantic Ocean genera Anna, Antillophos, Bailya, Caducifer, Monostiolum, and Parviphos, with description of a new genus, Dianthiphos, and notes on Engina and Hesperisternia Gastropoda: Buccinidae: Pisaniinae) and Cumia (Colubrariidae). The Nautilus. 123(4): 225-275

Pisaniidae